Brezje pri Lipoglavu is a small settlement in the hills southeast of Ljubljana in central Slovenia. It is part of the Ljubljana Urban Municipality. It lies in the traditional region of Lower Carniola and is now included with the rest of the municipality in the Central Slovenia Statistical Region.

Name
Brezje pri Lipoglavu was attested in written sources as Piͤrkch in 1408 and Possenpirich in 1464, among other spellings. The name of the settlement was changed from Brezje to Brezje pri Lipoglavu in 1953.

References

External links

Brezje pri Lipoglavu on Geopedia

Populated places in the City Municipality of Ljubljana
Sostro District